Newbiggin is a village on the A5087 road, in Furness, in the South Lakeland district, in the English county of Cumbria. Historically in Lancashire, nearby settlements include the large town of Barrow-in-Furness, the village of Aldingham and the hamlet of Roosebeck.

Newbiggin is in the civil parish of Aldingham.

References 

 Philip's Street Atlas Cumbria (page 171)

Villages in Cumbria
Furness
Aldingham